Presto chango may refer to:

 "Presto chango", magic words
 Prest-O Change-O, a 1939 Merrie Melodies cartoon 
 "Presto Change-O", an episode of The Fairly OddParents (season 5)
 "Presto Change-O", a song by Quasi from the 2006 album When the Going Gets Dark
 Presto Chango, a musical theater/performance group by Jeffrey Morgan